Rhene amanzi is a species of jumping spider in the genus Rhene. The male was first identified in 2013 and the female in 2018. It is small and dark brown, almost black, although the female is larger than the male. The species is named after the Amanzi Private Game Reserve in Free State, South Africa, which is the only place that it has been found. It differs from other spiders in the genus by the large triangular embolus found on the male and the shallow notch in the female's epigyne.

Taxonomy
Rhene amanzi was first identified by Wanda Wesołowska and Charles Haddad in 2013. It was allocated to the genus Rhene, which is named after the Greek female name, shared by mythological figures. The genus is part of the subtribe Dendryphantina in the tribe Dendryphantini, and is related to the genera Dendryphantes and Macaroeris. The species is named after the Amanzi Private Game Reserve, where the first example was collected.

Description
The spider was first identified in 2013, with initially only the male described by Wanda Wesołowska and Charles Haddad. The female was first described in 2018 by the same team. The spider is small, flat, robust and a very dark brown, almost black, in colour. The male is distinguished by its large triangular embolus. It has dark pedipalps and dark brown legs. It is similar to Dendryphantes neethlingi, differing in the way that the embolus curves.

The female is similar to the related Rhene timidus, but is smaller, despite being larger than the male. The carapace is dark, but has some very short white hairs on the edges. The abdomen also has some short dark hairs. It has a round epigyne with a small notch at the end. The copulatory openings are at the front. The epigyne differs from Rhene timidus in details, including having a shallower notch.

Distribution
Rhene amanzi has only been identified in the Amanzi Private Game Reserve near Brandfort in Free State, South Africa. Unusually for the genus, it has been found in grasslands as well as in wooded areas.

References

Citations

Bibliography

Endemic fauna of South Africa
Salticidae
Spiders of South Africa
Spiders described in 2013
Taxa named by Wanda Wesołowska